Charlotte Fitzroy may refer to one of the following:

Two illegitimate daughters of Charles II of England:
 Charlotte Lee, Countess of Lichfield, daughter by Barbara Villiers
Charlotte Jemima Henrietta Maria FitzRoy, daughter by Elizabeth Killigrew
Charlotte FitzRoy, Countess of Euston (1761–1808), whose husband was descended from an illegitimate son of Charles II